Babelomurex virginiae is a species of sea snail, a marine gastropod mollusc in the family Muricidae, the murex snails or rock snails.

Description

Distribution
The holotype of this marine species was found off New Caledonia.

References

 Kosuge, S. & Oliverio, M., 2004. Three new coralliophiline species from south-west Pacific (Neogastropoda: Muricidae: Coralliophilinae). Journal of Conchology 38(2): 147-153

virginiae
Gastropods described in 2004